Buzzard Creek is a stream in the U.S. state of South Dakota.

Buzzard Creek originally was a natural habitat of buzzards, hence the name.

See also
List of rivers of South Dakota

References

Rivers of Haakon County, South Dakota
Rivers of South Dakota